Bepink is a professional women's cycling team based in Italy, which competes in elite road bicycle racing events such as the UCI Women's World Tour.

Team history

2014

In November, it was announced that Astana would be moving sponsorship and resources away from the team, creating a new Kazakhstan based Women's team, . As a result, BePink stated it would partner with Italian apparel brand, La Classica. For 2015 the team raced under the name .

Riders in
On June 1, Ksenyia Tuhai joined the team. On August 1, 2014, Alison Tetrick joined the team along with Aliya Kargaliyeva as a stagiaire. On November 7, Ksenia Tuhai, Michela Maltese, Ana Covrig and Silvia Valsecchi. On November 8 the team signed Ilaria Sanguineti. On November 13 the team signed Ilaira Bonomi, Georgia Fraiegari, Tereza Medveďová, Jaime Nielsen, with Georgia Williams signing a contract extension. On November 14 the team signed Ruby Livingstone. On 18 November the team signed Simona Bortolotti and Anastasia Chulkova. On December 11, 2015, it was announced that Canadian cyclist Lex Albrecht signed with the team for the 2016 season.

Riders out
On October 30, Alice Algisi, Simona Frapporti and Dalia Muccioli left the team to join Alé–Cipollini for the 2015 season. On November 19 Barbara Guarischi and Alena Amialiusik left the team to join . As a result of the creation of the new Kazakh-based team a number of Kazakh riders left the team. On November 28, Marzhan Baitlevova, Makhabbat Umutzhanova and Aliya Kargaliyeva left the team to join Astana-Acca Due O.

Team roster

Major wins

2012
Grand Prix El Salvador, Noemi Cantele
Stage 1 Vuelta Ciclista Femenina a el Salvador, Noemi Cantele
Stage 6 Vuelta Ciclista Femenina a el Salvador, Silvia Valsecchi
Grand Prix Grand Saint Bernard, Evelyn García
GP Liberazione — WE, Noemi Cantele
Stage 1 Tour of Adygeya WE, Yuliya Martisova
Stage 1 Giro del Trentino Alto Adige-Südtirol, Noemi Cantele
Prologue Route de France Féminine, Alena Amialiusik
Stage 3 Route de France Féminine, Simona Frapporti
2013
Grand Prix San Miguel, Noemi Cantele
Overall Vuelta a El Salvador, Noemi Cantele
Stages 1 & 4, Noemi Cantele
Grand Prix El Salvador, Silvia Valsecchi
Youth classification Festival Luxembourgeois du cyclisme féminin, Georgia Williams
Mountains classification Tour Languedoc Roussillon, Alena Amialiusik
Youth classification, Georgia Williams
Stage 1a (TTT) Giro del Trentino Alto Adige-Südtirol
Stage 2 (ITT) Tour Cycliste Féminin International de l'Ardèche, Alena Amialiusik
2014
 Mountains classification Vuelta Internacional Femenina a Costa Rica, Alena Amialiusik
 Youth classification, Susanna Zorzi
Stage 3, Alena Amialiusik
Grand Prix el Salvador, Alena Amialiusik
 Points classification Vuelta a El Salvador, Alena Amialiusik
 Sprints classification, Anna Stricker
 Youth classification Dalia Muccioli
Teams classification
Stages 1 & 2, Alena Amialiusik
Stage 1 Tour de Bretagne Féminin, Doris Schweizer
Teams classification Tour Cycliste Féminin International de l'Ardèche
Stage 5, Alena Amialiusik
 Combativity award Stage 4 Boels Rental Ladies Tour, Alison Tetrick
2015
Stage 3 Tour of Zhoushan Island, Anastasia Chulkova
 Overall Tour de Bretagne Féminin, Ilaria Sanguineti
 Youth classification, Ilaria Sanguineti
Team classification 
Stage 1, Ilaria Sanguineti
2016
Chrono de Gatineau, Amber Neben
Stage 2 (ITT) Tour de Bretagne Feminin, Silvia Valsecchi
Stage 4 Tour de Bretagne Feminin, Ilaria Sanguineti
 Overall La Route de France, Amber Neben
Stages 4 (ITT) & 5, Amber Neben
2017
 Youth classification Emakumeen Bira, Nikola Nosková
Giro del Trentino Alto Adige-Sudtirol, Nikola Nosková
 Youth classification Tour Cycliste Féminin International de l'Ardèche, Nikola Nosková
Stage 4, Silvia Valsecchi
 Combativity award Stage 1, Silvia Valsecchi
2018
Stage 7 Tour Cycliste Féminin International de l'Ardèche, Erica Magnaldi
2019
 Mountains classification Vuelta a Burgos Feminas, Katia Ragusa
2020
 Stage 4 Women's Tour Down Under, Simona Frapporti
2022
 Youth classification Vuelta a Burgos Feminas, Silvia Zanardi
Stage 2 Vuelta a Burgos Feminas, Matilde Vitillo
Visegrad 4 Ladies Series Hungary, Silvia Zanardi
Stage 4 Tour International des Pyrénées, Silvia Zanardi
Stage 6 Tour de l'Ardèche, Silvia Zanardi
Stages 2 & 4 Vuelta a Formosa, Valentina Basilico

National champions

2012
 Belarus Time Trial, Alena Amialiusik
2013
 Belarus Road Race, Alena Amialiusik
 Switzerland Road Race, Doris Schweizer
 Italy Road Race, Dalia Muccioli
 Belarus Time Trial, Alena Amialiusik
2014
 Belarus Time Trial, Alena Amialiusik
 Belarus Road Race, Alena Amialiusik
 Italy Track (500m Time Trial), Simona Frapporti
 Italy Track (Omnium), Simona Frapporti
 Italy Track (Individual pursuit), Silvia Valsecchi
2015
 New Zealand Time Trial, Jaime Nielsen
 New Zealand Track (Individual pursuit), Jaime Nielsen
 Slovakia Time Trial, Tereza Medveďová
 Italy Time Trial, Silvia Valsecchi
 Romania Road Race, Ana Maria Covrig
 Romania Time Trial, Ana Maria Covrig
2016
 World Time Trial, Amber Neben
 European Track (Team pursuit), Silvia Valsecchi 
 European Track (Team pursuit), Francesca Pattaro 
2017
 Russian Track (Points race), Olga Zabelinskaya 
 Czech Time Trial, Nikola Nosková
 Czech Road Race, Nikola Nosková
 European Track (Team Pursuit), Silvia Valsecchi 
2018
 Slovakia Road Race, Tereza Medveďová
 Slovakia Track (500m Time Trial), Tereza Medveďová
 Slovakia Track (Individual Pursuit), Tereza Medveďová
 European Under-23 Road, Nikola Nosková
2019
 Slovakia Track (500m Time Trial), Tereza Medveďová
 Slovakia Track (Individual Pursuit), Tereza Medveďová
2020
 European U23 Track (Points race), Silvia Zanardi
2021
 Slovakia Track (Individual Pursuit), Nora Jenčušová
 European U23 Track (Individual Pursuit), Silvia Zanardi
 European U23 Track (Team Pursuit), Silvia Zanardi
 European U23 Track (Points race), Silvia Zanardi
 European U23 Road Race, Silvia Zanardi
2022
 Slovakia Time Trial, Nora Jenčušová
 Slovakia Road Race, Nora Jenčušová
 European U23 (Team Pursuit), Matilde Vitillo
 European U23 (Team Pursuit), Silvia Zanardi
 European U23 (Madison), Matilde Vitillo
 European U23 (Madison), Silvia Zanardi
 European U23 (Points race), Silvia Zanardi

References

External links

Cycling teams based in Italy
UCI Women's Teams
Cycling teams established in 2012
Astana BePink Womens Team